Aremi Fuentes Zavala (born 23 May 1993) is a Mexican weightlifter. She competes in the 69 and 76 kg categories, in addition to representing Mexico in international competitions.

Career
She competed at world championships, including at the 2015 World Weightlifting Championships.

In 2021, Fuentes competed at the 2020 Summer Olympics in the women's 76 kg weightlifting competition by lifting 108 kg and 137 kg in the snatch and clean & jerk phases respectively for a total of 245 kg to win the bronze medal, being this the third bronze one earned for her country.

Major results

References

External links
 
 
 
 

1993 births
Living people
Mexican female weightlifters
Weightlifters at the 2010 Summer Youth Olympics
Weightlifters at the 2011 Pan American Games
Weightlifters at the 2015 Pan American Games
Weightlifters at the 2019 Pan American Games
Weightlifters at the 2020 Summer Olympics
Medalists at the 2011 Pan American Games
Medalists at the 2015 Pan American Games
Medalists at the 2019 Pan American Games
Medalists at the 2020 Summer Olympics
Olympic medalists in weightlifting
Olympic bronze medalists for Mexico
Pan American Games medalists in weightlifting
Pan American Games bronze medalists for Mexico
Sportspeople from Chiapas
People from Tonalá, Chiapas
Olympic weightlifters of Mexico
21st-century Mexican women